Brian Michael Levant (born August 6, 1952) is an American filmmaker.

Early life and career
Born in Highland Park, Illinois, Levant started his career in 1976 as a writer for the TV series  Happy Days. He also wrote for, among other TV shows, The Jeffersons, Mork & Mindy and Still the Beaver.

He is best known for directing the films Beethoven, The Flintstones and its 2000 prequel The Flintstones in Viva Rock Vegas, Jingle All the Way, Snow Dogs and Are We There Yet?.

Though his work is generally disliked by film critics, Levant has responded to the criticism with, "I'm making movies for the audience that I was when I was sitting at home watching Garfield Goose and The Three Stooges on WGN...To read those reviews is an act of self-flagellation, but reviews be damned when you're at Blockbuster, and you're seeing family after family grab one of your movies off the shelf on a Friday night. I can't tell you how many times I've seen that."

Levant is a major collector of 20th century toys and pop culture memorabilia. His collection is displayed in a 2022 book, My Life and Toys.

Filmography

Feature film
Director
 Problem Child 2 (1991)
 Beethoven (1992)
 The Flintstones (1994)
 Jingle All the Way (1996)
 The Flintstones in Viva Rock Vegas (2000)
 Snow Dogs (2002)
 Are We There Yet? (2005)
 The Spy Next Door (2010)
 Max 2: White House Hero (2017)

Writer
 Leave It to Beaver (1997)

Direct-to-video

Television 
TV movies

TV series

References

External links
 
 

1952 births
Film producers from Illinois
American male screenwriters
American television directors
Television producers from Illinois
American television writers
Film directors from Illinois
Living people
People from Highland Park, Illinois
American male television writers
Screenwriters from Illinois
Comedy film directors